Emily Burnett (born 8 August 1997) is a Welsh actress. From 2017 to 2019, she portrayed the role of Charlie Morris in the CBBC series The Dumping Ground, a role for which she won the 2019 British Academy Children's Award for Performer. In 2020, she portrayed the role of Jas Salford in fellow CBBC series So Awkward. In 2021, Burnett was cast in the Channel 4 soap opera Hollyoaks as Olivia Bradshaw.

Early life
Burnett was born in Cardiff, Wales, where she went on to study art. She has cited her father as an influence for getting into acting, recalling that he introduced her to films at a young age.

Career
In 2011, Burnett appeared in an episode of the CBBC series The Sparticle Mystery. She made her professional stage debut in a production of Love is the Revolution at the Soho Theatre. A year later, she starred in a production titled Beacons. In 2017, Burnett was cast in the CBBC series The Dumping Ground as Charlie Morris. She stayed in the series until 2019. For her role as Charlie, Burnett was awarded the 2019 British Academy Children's Award for Performer. She then starred in the S4C series Merched Parchus as Cai in 2019. A year later, Burnett was cast as Jas Salford in the CBBC series So Awkward. Later in 2020, she appeared in an episode of the BBC soap opera Doctors as Zadie Stiller. In 2021, Burnett was cast in the Channel 4 soap opera Hollyoaks as Olivia Bradshaw.

Filmography

Stage

Video games

Awards and nominations

References

External links
 

1997 births
Living people
Black British actresses
Welsh child actresses
Welsh stage actresses
Welsh soap opera actresses
Welsh television actresses
Welsh video game actresses
Actresses from Cardiff
21st-century Welsh actresses